Thomas A. Hicks (June 1, 1918 – July 14, 1992) was an American bobsledder who competed in the late 1940s. He won a bronze medal in the four-man event at the 1948 Winter Olympics in St. Moritz.

References
Bobsleigh four-man Olympic medalists for 1924, 1932–56, and since 1964
DatabaseOlympics.com profile

1918 births
1992 deaths
American male bobsledders
Bobsledders at the 1948 Winter Olympics
Medalists at the 1948 Winter Olympics
Olympic bronze medalists for the United States in bobsleigh